The Lieutenant Governor of Hong Kong held the second-highest position during the British colonial rule in Hong Kong from 1843 to 1902.

History

Although Lieutenant Governor of Hong Kong was the second-highest position in Hong Kong, the Lieutenant Governor did not have any actual power in the Government – that power usually was gained by the Colonial Secretary.

The first Lieutenant Governor of Hong Kong was George D'Aguilar and the post was subsequently held by the Commander British Forces in Hong Kong, thus all were British Army officers.

List of lieutenant governors

Demise of the post

From the 1870s to 1902, the role lapsed from formal use and the second in command was transferred to the Colonial Secretary of Hong Kong (Chief Secretary from 1976 to 1997). The following individuals may (or may not) have retained the title for special occasions

Residence

The Lieutenant Governor as Commander of British Forces resided at Flagstaff House, then known as Headquarter House, from 1844 to 1902.

See also

 Governor of Hong Kong
 History of Colonial Hong Kong (1800s – 1930s)

References

British Hong Kong
1843 establishments in Hong Kong